Virtually Famous is a British comedy panel game show most recently presented by Chris Ramsey. In each episode, two teams of three panelists compete. The teams were, in the final series, captained by Vicky Pattison and Seann Walsh. The questions and the tasks are about items found on the internet.

The programme made its debut on E4 on 21 July 2014 with Kevin McHale as host and Chris Stark as team captain opposite Walsh. On 26 November 2014, it was announced that the show had been recommissioned for a second and third series. For the fourth and final series, Chris Ramsey replaced McHale as host and Vicky Pattison replaced Stark as team captain.

Transmissions

Episodes
The coloured backgrounds denote the result of each of the shows:

 – indicates Chris/Vicky's team won.
 – indicates Seann's team won.
 – indicates the game ended in a draw.

Series 1 (2014)

Series 2 (2015)

Series 3 (2016)

Series 4 (2016–2017)

Scores

Footnotes

References

External links

2010s British comedy television series
2010s British game shows
2014 British television series debuts
2017 British television series endings
Channel 4 panel games
E4 comedy
English-language television shows
Television series by Hungry Bear Media
Television series by Fremantle (company)
Television shows shot at Elstree Film Studios